Arcata (YTB-768) was a United States Navy  named for Arcata, California, and the third navy ship to carry the name.

Construction

The contract for Arcata was awarded 18 January 1963. She was laid down on 15 May 1963 at Mobile, Alabama, by Mobile Ship Repair and launched 30 November 1963.

Operational history

After completing her trials, Arcata was placed in service and, by March 1965, was permanently assigned to the 13th Naval District, based at Bremerton, Washington, to provide harbor tug services to ships in the waters of that district.

References 

 
 

Natick-class large harbor tugs
1963 ships
Ships built in Mobile, Alabama
Ships sunk as targets